The  is a collection of 17 Greek writings whose authorship is traditionally attributed to the legendary Hellenistic figure Hermes Trismegistus, a syncretic combination of the Greek god Hermes and the Egyptian god Thoth. It was translated into Latin in the 15th century by the Italian humanist scholars Marsilio Ficino (1433–1499) and Lodovico Lazzarelli (1447–1500).

Although the Latin word  is usually reserved for the entire body of extant writings related to some author or subject, the  contains only a very small selection of extant Hermetic texts (texts attributed to Hermes Trismegistus, commonly known as ). Its individual treatises were quoted by many authors from the second and third centuries on, but the compilation as such is first attested only in the writings of the Byzantine philosopher Michael Psellus (c. 1017–1078).

Following their translation into Latin by Ficino and Lazzarelli, the  greatly influenced the Western esoteric tradition. It was especially considered to be important during the Renaissance and the Reformation, in which Hermeticism would often function as a type of intermediate position between Christianity and paganism.

Background
Most of the texts are presented in the form of a dialogue, a favorite form for didactic material in Classical antiquity. However, at least until the 19th century, this name (under various forms, such Pimander or Pymander) was also commonly used to designate the compilation as a whole.

The 15th-century translation of the  into Latin provided a seminal impetus in the development of Renaissance thought and culture, having a profound impact on philosophers such as Pico della Mirandola (1463–1494), Giordano Bruno (1548–1600), Francesco Patrizi (1529–1597), Robert Fludd (1574–1637), and many others.

Latin translation
In 1462, Marsilio Ficino (1433–1499) was working on a Latin translation of the collected works of Plato for his patron Cosimo de' Medici (the first member of the famous de' Medici family who ruled Florence during the Italian Renaissance). However, when a manuscript of the  became available, he immediately interrupted his work on Plato in order to start translating the works of Hermes, which at the time were thought to be much more ancient, and therefore much more authoritative, than those of Plato.

While Ficino translated the first fourteen treatises (I–XIV), Lodovico Lazzarelli (1447–1500) translated the remaining three (XVI–XVIII). The Chapter no. XV of early modern editions was once filled with an entry from the Suda (a tenth-century Byzantine encyclopedia) and three excerpts from Hermetic works preserved by Joannes Stobaeus (fl. fifth century), but this chapter was left out in later editions, which therefore contain no chapter XV.

Names of the treatises

I. Discourse of Poimandres to Hermes Trismegistus
II. Hermes to Asclepius
III. A sacred discourse of Hermes
IV. A discourse of Hermes to Tat: The mixing bowl or the monad
V. A discourse of Hermes to Tat, his son: That god is invisible and entirely visible
VI. Hermes to Asclepius: That the good is in god alone and nowhere else
VII. That the greatest evil in mankind is ignorance concerning god
VIII. Hermes to Tat: That none of the things that are is destroyed, and they are mistaken who say that changes are deaths and destructions
IX. Hermes to Asclepius: On understanding and sensation: [That the beautiful and good are in god alone and nowhere else]
X. Hermes to Tat: The key
XI. Mind (Nous) to Hermes
XII. Hermes to Tat: On the mind shared in common
XIII. Hermes to Tat, a secret dialogue on the mountain: On being born again, and on the promise to be silent
XIV. Hermes to Asclepius: health of mind
XVI. Asclepius to King Ammon: Definitions on god, matter, vice, fate, the sun, intellectual essence, divine essence, mankind, the arrangement of the plenitude, the seven stars, and mankind according to the image
XVII. Asclepius to King Ammon
XVIII. Tat to a king: On the soul hindered by the body's affections

See also

Hermes Trismegistus
Hermetica, writings attributed to Hermes Trismegistus
Definitions of Hermes Trismegistus to Asclepius, Hermetic treatise belonging to the same subgenre of 'religio-philosophical' Hermetica
The Discourse on the Eighth and Ninth, Hermetic treatise belonging to the same subgenre of 'religio-philosophical' Hermetica
Hermeticism, philosophical systems based on the writings attributed to Hermes Trismegistus

References

Works cited

External links
 

15th-century Latin books
16th-century Latin books
Greek pseudepigrapha
Hermetica
Latin pseudepigrapha
Ancient Greek philosophical literature
Renaissance Latin literature
Texts in Koine Greek
Works of unknown authorship